North Carolina Highway 68 (NC 68) is a north–south state highway in North Carolina. It serves as a connector between Interstate 40 (I-40)/ U.S. Route 421 (US 421) and Piedmont Triad International Airport (via I-73). On its routing from Thomasville to Stokesdale, NC 68 passes through urban High Point, the western outskirts of Greensboro, and the town of Oak Ridge. The segment from just north of the I-40/US 421 interchange to Pleasant Ridge Road in Guilford County is a limited access freeway.

Route description
Beginning in the south at Business I-85/US 29/US 70, the route travels north out of Thomasville in Davidson County as National Highway, a name which referred to the former routing of US 29/70 (later US 29A/70A) along this segment. Crossing from Davidson County into neighboring Guilford County and the city of High Point, NC 68 is cosigned with English Road. Approximately  within the city limits, NC 68 turns left onto Westchester Drive, a boulevard that bypasses High Point's downtown area. Arriving at the Main Street interchange, NC 68 continues onto Eastchester Drive, another boulevard. After passing Oak Hollow Mall, I-74 (High Point East Belt), and the Wendover Avenue interchange, NC 68 and Eastchester Drive continue north into neighboring Greensboro.

Shortly after entering Greensboro, NC 68 meets Interstate 40/US 421, and becomes a controlled access highway after a traffic signal controlled intersection with Triad Center Drive. Continuing north as a divided four-lane highway, NC 68 has junctions with W. Market Street (Colfax exit) and I-73, the exit for Piedmont Triad International Airport. The road downgrades to an undivided primary road at the Pleasant Ridge Road junction. From there, the route heads north through the heart of Oak Ridge, North Carolina, passing the Oak Ridge Military Academy at the route's intersection with NC 150. After crossing the Haw River into Stokesdale, NC 68 crosses US 158 and joins NC 65 for a short  concurrency, before splitting to the northeast en route to its northern terminus at US 220 in Rockingham County. This interchange doubles as the current northern terminus of I-73 though no direct access is provided between I-73 and NC 68.

History
The first NC 68 was an original state highway that traversed from NC 60, in Millers Creek (west of Wilkesboro), northwest through Glendale Springs, Jefferson and Crumpler, before crossing into Virginia. By 1928, NC 68 was rerouted west of Jefferson onto new primary routing west to the Tennessee state line; the old alignment becoming NC 681.  In 1929, all of NC 68 was replaced by an extension of NC 16.

The second and current NC 68 was established in 1930 as a new primary routing from US 70/US 170/NC 10, northeast of High Point, to NC 65, in Stokesdale. In 1936, NC 68 was rerouted south through High Point to US 29A/US 70A (Lexington Avenue); its old alignment, along Penny Road, became a secondary road.  In 1941, NC 68 was extended north on new primary routing to US 220 (Sylvania Road).

In 1952, NC 68 was extended north to its current terminus with the then new US 220 bypass, replacing part of old US 220 (Sylvania Road).  Between 1950 and 1953, NC 68 was extended south to English Street.  In 1956 or 1957, NC 68 was extended to its current southern terminus, sharing a concurrency with US 29A/US 70A, until 1991.  In 1982, NC 68 was placed on new freeway connecting I-40 and bypassing the Piedmont Triad International Airport, its old alignment along Bull Road (today's Regional Road) a secondary road.

Major intersections

References

External links

 
 NCRoads.com: N.C. 68

068
Transportation in Davidson County, North Carolina
Transportation in Guilford County, North Carolina
Transportation in Rockingham County, North Carolina
Transportation in Greensboro, North Carolina
High Point, North Carolina